The Liberal–Labour movement refers to the practice of local Liberal associations accepting and supporting candidates who were financially maintained by trade unions. These candidates stood for the British Parliament with the aim of representing the working classes, while remaining supportive of the Liberal Party in general.

The first Lib–Lab candidate to stand was George Odger in the 1870 Southwark by-election. The first Lib–Lab candidates to be elected were Alexander MacDonald and Thomas Burt, both members of the Miners' Federation of Great Britain (MFGB), in the 1874 general election.  In 1880, they were joined by Henry Broadhurst of the Operative Society of Masons and the movement reached its peak in 1885, with twelve MPs elected. These include William Abraham (Mabon) in the Rhondda division whose claims to the Liberal nomination were essentially based on his working class credentials.

The candidates generally stood with the support of the Liberal Party, the Labour Representation League and one or more trade unions.  After 1885, decline set in.  Disillusion grew from the defeat of the Manningham Mills Strike, a series of decisions restricting the activity of unions, culminating in the Taff Vale Case and largely unchallenged by the Liberal Party, and the foundation of the Independent Labour Party in 1893 followed by its turn towards trade unionism.

The formation of the Labour Representation Committee in 1900, followed by the Labour Party in 1906, meant that in the House of Commons, there were two groups of MPs containing trade union–sponsored MPs, sitting on either side of the chamber (about 28 took the Labour whip and about 23 took the Liberal whip).  The Trades Union Congress decided to instruct its affiliate unions to require their MPs to stand at the next election as Labour Party candidates and take the Labour whip. Of the 23 trade union–sponsored Liberal MPs, 15 were sponsored by unions affiliated to the Miners Federation of Great Britain (MFGB). When the MFGB affiliated to the Labour Party in 1909, most of their MPs joined Labour after the January 1910 general election.

The Liberal-Labour group finally died out at the 1918 general election, when Thomas Burt (by then Father of the House) and Arthur Richardson stood down.

List of Liberal-Labour MPs

See also 
 :Category:Liberal-Labour (UK) politicians
 :Category:Liberal-Labour (UK) MPs

References

Politics of the United Kingdom
Liberal Party (UK)
History of the Labour Party (UK)